The creation of the tradition of the political community of Spaniards as common destiny over other communities has been argued to trace back to the Cortes of Cádiz. Revisiting the history of Spain, after 1812 Spanish liberalism tended to take for granted the national conscience and the Spanish nation.

During the first half of 20th century (notably during the dictatorship of Primo de Rivera), a new brand of Spanish nationalism with marked military flavour vouching for authoritarian stances (as well as promoting policies favouring the Spanish language against the other languages in the country) as means of country modernization was brought forward from the conservative camp, fusing regenerationist principles with traditional Spanish nationalism. The authoritarian national ideal resumed during the Francoist dictatorship, in the form of National-Catholicism, which was in turn complemented by the myth of the Hispanidad. 
Identified with Francoism, positive affirmation of Spanish nationalism was delegitimised after the death of the dictator in 1975. 

A distinct manifestation of Spanish nationalism in modern Spanish politics is the interchange of attacks with the different regional nationalisms. Initially present after the end of Francoism in a rather diffuse and reactive form, the Spanish nationalist discourse has been often self-branded as "constitutional patriotism" since the 1980s. Often ignored as in the case of other State nationalisms, its alleged "non-existence" has been a commonplace espoused by prominent figures in the public sphere as well as the mass-media in the country.

History

Historically, Spanish nationalism specifically emerged with liberalism, during the Spanish War of Independence against Napoleon I of France.
Since 1808 we speak of nationalism in Spain: ethnic patriotism became fully national, at least among the elite. This was unmistakably the work of liberals. The modernized elites used the occasion to try to impose a program of social and political changes. Their method was to launch the revolutionary idea of the nation as the holder of sovereignty. This idea of sovereignty is believed to have mobilized the Spanish victoriously against a foreign army and against collaborators of José Bonaparte, regarded as non-Spanish (afrancesados). The Spanish liberals turned their victory on the battlefield to an feverish identity of patriotism and the defense of liberty: as the Asturian deputy Agustín Argüelles when he presented the Constitution of 1812, "Spaniards, you now have a homeland." José Álvarez Junco

The Carlism, which was a defensive movement of the Old Regime, did not regard the adjective "national" with any esteem (national sovereignty, national militia, or national properties) and considered it a term used only by liberals (who were becoming more and more progresistas). Up until the 1860s, the Carlism movement tended to label its followers as "Catholics" rather than as "Spaniards". 
 
It was after the 1859–1860 Hispano-Moroccan War (which was embraced by an until then unseen patriotic fervour across the political spectrum), when the until then rather uninterested Catholic conservative forces were sold into the possibilities offered by Spanish nationalism; thus, in the last half of the century, a number of Conservative historians (most notably Menéndez Pelayo, whose figure eventually became a lodestar of national catholicism) propelled a new canon of the history of Spain underpinned by their idea of "Catholic unity" as tenet for the Spanish nationality and the monarchy. The menéndezpelayista nationalist construct was well defined in its Catholic matrix (Catholicism would end up becoming the keystone of the reactionary right wing in the 20th century) yet more nuanced in other regards accounting for both a staunch rejection of alternative nationalisms and separatisms and a recognition of the internal plurality of Spain.

With the loss of Cuba interpreted as the first crack on the unity of the nation (the Cuban War had been seen by many in the country as a civil war rather than a foreign conflict), Spanish nationalism of the time had to come to terms with the loss of the island at a time when the possession of colonies was seen as a sign of the vitality of the nation.

The so-called "spirit of the 98", created after disaster of 1898, entailed a response coming from the elite intellectual milieus striving for the development of a new Spanish nationalism. While this reaction was not initially identified per se with the right, (several of the representatives of the literary nationalism of the 98 were actually close to socialist or anarchist stances early in their life) many of the most prominent noventayochistas espoused ideas compatible with the conservative thought and several of them eventually evolved towards non-liberal forms of Conservatism, and a group of them would have a substantial intellectual influence in the moulding of the later Fascist ultranationalism. While not yet Fascist nor proto-Fascist, the socalled : Azorín, Pío Baroja and Ramiro de Maeztu, laid the seeds for a potential doctrinal articulation susceptible of being seized by a Fascist movement.

In the view of Ismael Saz, within regenerationism, a diverse brand of nationalism, the two main antiliberal nationalist political cultures in the 20th century in Spain would come to be forged: the reactionary nationalist one (national catholicism) and the fascist one, both enjoying hegemony during the Francoist dictatorship.

Spanish liberal philosopher and essayist José Ortega y Gasset defined Spain as an "enthusing project for a life in common (proyecto sugestivo de vida en común). Meanwhile, the Fascist leader José Antonio Primo de Rivera preferred the definition of a "unity of destiny in the universal" and defended a return to the traditional and spiritual values of Imperial Spain. The idea of empire makes it universalist rather than localist, this is what makes it singular among other forms of nationalisms, but closer to others (Italian fascism).

Post-1978 politics 
The political transition which occurred in Spain, together with social and economic changes rooted in a detailed sense of modernization, began at the end of Franco's time in power and lasted until the creation of current institutions (Spanish Constitution of 1978 and Statutes of Autonomy). This also produced a strong reversal of the social uses for Spanish symbols of national identification.

Peripheral nationalisms have acquired a significant presence and territorial power, especially in Catalonia (Convergence and Union Republican Left of Catalonia) and the Basque Country (Basque Nationalist Party, as well as among EA and so-called abertzale left). The numbers are substantially lower in comparison to Catalonia and Basque Country, but these nationalisms are still present in Navarre (Nabai) and Galicia (Galician National Bloc) too. The Canary Islands (Coalición Canaria), Andalusia (Partido Andalucista) and other autonomous communities also have less obvious nationalism and are often grouped as regionalisms, based on linguistic or historical differential facts no less distinct than the previous ones.

In comparison to other nationalisms, "Spanish nationalism" is often referred to as españolismo, an equivalent to centralism. Usually with a controversial political purpose, it may be identified with conservative nostalgia for Franco's regime or with alleged state oppression in those territories, which in extreme cases (particularly ETA in the Basque Country and Navarre) is used as justification for terrorism that sees itself as armed struggle for national liberation. By contrast, none of the major political parties affected by such designation of españolistas or "Spanish nationalists", self-identify as such. Instead, they use the phrase non-nationalist to separate themselves from the nationalist, which is how they usually designate the so-called "periphery" or outliers.

It seeks to respect the different visions of Spain and fit it into a pluralistic framework, inclusive and non-exclusive. Concepts which often coincide the majority's political parties, Spanish Socialist Workers' Party and People's Party, the minority's, United Left, Union, Progress and Democracy, and other regional or nationalist parties sometimes called moderate'', despite maintaining deep political differences.

After the 2017 thwarted referendum on Catalan independence, hitherto stigmatized public displays of Spanish nationalism (such as flags hanging from buildings) increased.

See also
Nationalisms and regionalisms of Spain
Spanish unionism
Spanish republicanism
Spanish irredentism
Iberian federalism (Iberism)
The two Spains
Hispanophobia

References

 
Nationalism in Spain